Chris Kamulete Makiese Ntinu Ntuluengani (born 14 October 1987) is a French former professional footballer who played as a striker.

Career
Born in Montfermeil, Makiese played youth football with Troyes, before beginning his senior career with Lille during the 2006–07 season. He spent loan spells at Belgian clubs Charleroi and Zulte Waregem, before moving to Zulte Waregem on a permanent deal. He signed for Stade Laval for the 2010–11 season. On 23 July 2011, he moved to Belgian Pro League side RAEC Mons, only to move again one season later, now to Visé.

External links
 
 Voetbal International 
 Chris Makiese Interview

1987 births
Living people
People from Montfermeil
French footballers
French sportspeople of Democratic Republic of the Congo descent
French expatriate footballers
Expatriate footballers in Belgium
Lille OSC players
Ligue 1 players
Ligue 2 players
Belgian Pro League players
R. Charleroi S.C. players
R.A.E.C. Mons players
C.S. Visé players
Challenger Pro League players
Association football forwards
Footballers from Seine-Saint-Denis
Black French sportspeople